Wander About Me is a 2017 Iranian film directed by Ghazaleh Soltani.

Plot
It is the story of a 30 years old girl Sayeh who in the middle of the big city is pursuing her dreams and ideals. She is a single and independent girl who wants to have a baby but she doesn't want to get married. This film was released in the 35th Fajr Film Festival, Tehran. It has been screened at the 8th edition of the Bridges International Film Festival in Greece. Wander about me has been selected to be screened at  Cyprus International Film Festival.

Cast
 Mehraveh Sharifinia as Sayeh
 Behnaz Jafari as Asal  (Baby's mother)
 Nasrin Nakisa as Malih Khanom
 Soosan Maghsoodloo as Mrs. Rezvani
 Mohsen Soleimani as Peiman 
 Ali Golzadeh as Somayeh
 Atoosa Rasti as Mina
 Bahram Sarvari Nezhad as Mansour
 Maryam Noormohamadi as Maryam

Award 
Mehraveh Sharifinia was granted the best actress award at Greece Bridges Peloponnesian International Film Festival for her role in this film. At the ceremony Sharifinia said: "It's my pleasure to be awarded as the best actress for the movie "Wander about me" in Bridges Film Festival. And it's good to have my prize in this women's film festival."

References

External links
 

2017 films
Iranian drama films
2010s Persian-language films